Below Deck Sailing Yacht is an American reality television series that premiered on Bravo on February 3, 2020. Developed as the second spin-off of Below Deck, it has aired three seasons.

The series chronicles the lives of the crew members who work and reside aboard a 177 foot (44 meter) sailing yacht during charter seasons in Greece (Season 1), Croatia (Season 2), and Spain (Season 3).

The most recent season, Season 3, was filmed in Spain and premiered February 21, 2022.

Cast

Season 1 (Parsifal III) 
 Glenn Shephard — Captain
 Byron Hissey — Chief Engineer
 Paget Berry — First Officer
 Adam Glick — Chef
 Jenna MacGillivray — Chief Stewardess
 Madison Stalker — 2nd Stewardess
 Georgia Grobler — 3rd Stewardess
 Ciara Duggan — Deckhand
 Parker McCown — Deckhand (ep 1–12)
 Christopher Miller — Deckhand (ep 12–17)

Season 2 (Parsifal III) 
 Glenn Shephard — Captain
 Colin Macrae — Chief Engineer
 Gary King — First Officer
 Natasha De Bourg — Chef
 Daisy Kelliher — Chief Stewardess
 Dani Soares — 2nd Stewardess
 Alli Dore — 3rd Stewardess
 Sydney Zaruba — Deckhand
 Jean-Luc Cerza Lanaux — Deckhand

Season 3 (Parsifal III) 
 Glenn Shephard —  Captain
 Colin Macrae — Chief Engineer
 Gary King — First Officer
 Marcos Spaziani — Chef
 Daisy Kelliher — Chief Stewardess
 Gabriela Barragán — 2nd Stewardess (ep 1–10)
 Ashley Marti— 3rd Stewardess (1–11), Junior Stewardess (12–17)
 Kelsie Goglia — Deckhand
 Tom Pearson — Deckhand (ep 1–7)
 Barnaby Birkbeck — Deckhand (ep 11–17)
 Scarlett Bentley — Junior Stewardess (ep 12–17)

Season 4 (Parsifal III) 
 Glenn Shephard —  Captain
 Colin Macrae — Chief Engineer
 Gary King — First Officer
 Ileisha Dell — Chef
 Daisy Kelliher — Chief Stewardess
 Lucy Edmunds — 2nd Stewardess
 Mads Herrera — 3rd Stewardess
 Chase Lemacks — Deckhand
 Alex Propson — Deckhand

Timeline

Episodes

Series overview

Season 1 (2020)

Season 2 (2021)

Season 3 (2022)

Season 4 (2023)

References

External links 
 
 

2020s American reality television series
2020 American television series debuts
Bravo (American TV network) original programming
Television series by 51 Minds Entertainment
Television series by Endemol
Below Deck (franchise)
English-language television shows
Reality television spin-offs
Television shows filmed in Greece
Television shows filmed in Croatia
Television shows filmed in Spain
American television spin-offs
Yachting
